is a former Japanese football player and manager. He played for Japan national team.

Club career
Kiyokumo was born in Koshu on September 11, 1950. After graduating from Hosei University, he joined Furukawa Electric in 1973. In 1976, the club won the championship in the Japan Soccer League and the Emperor's Cup. The club also won the 1977 and 1982 JSL Cups. He retired in 1982. He played 149 games and scored 6 goals in the league. He was selected as one of the Best Eleven in 1974, 1975, and 1976.

National team career
On September 28, 1974, Kiyokumo debuted for Japan national team against South Korea. He played at 1976 Summer Olympics qualification, 1978 World Cup qualification and 1980 Summer Olympics qualification. He played 42 games for Japan until 1980.

Coaching career
After retirement, Kiyokumo became a manager for Furukawa Electric as Masao Uchino successor in 1984. He led the club to won 1985–86 Japan Soccer League, 1986 JSL Cup. In Asia, the club won 1986 Asian Club Championship. This is first Asian champion as a Japanese club. He resigned in 1990. In 1992, he served a coach for Japan national team under manager Hans Ooft. In 1994, he returned to JEF United Ichihara (former Furukawa Electric) and managed the club until 1995. In 1998, became a manager for Japan U-20 national team. In 1999, he signed with Omiya Ardija and became a general manager. In October 2003, he became a manager as Masaaki Kanno's successor.

Club statistics

National team statistics

Managerial statistics

References

External links

Japan National Football Team Database

1950 births
Living people
Hosei University alumni
Association football people from Yamanashi Prefecture
Japanese footballers
Japan Soccer League players
JEF United Chiba players
Japan international footballers
Japanese football managers
J1 League managers
J2 League managers
JEF United Chiba managers
Omiya Ardija managers
Association football defenders